Jared J. Heine (born September 6, 1984) is an American-Marshallese swimmer, who specialized in backstroke events. He acquired a dual citizenship to participate internationally for the Marshall Islands at the 2008 Summer Olympics, placing himself among the top 45 swimmers in the 100 m backstroke.

Heine was one of the five athletes to mark an Olympic debut for the Marshall Islands at the 2008 Summer Olympics in Beijing, competing in the men's 100 m backstroke. He cleared a minute barrier to finish the opening heat with a lifetime bodysuit best of 58.86 for a third-place finish and forty-third overall on the evening prelims, failing to advance to the semifinals.

Heine is an information science graduate at the Florida State University in Tallahassee, Florida, and a member and senior coach of Kamehameha Swim Club in his hometown Honolulu.

References

External links
 
Profile – Florida State Seminoles
Profile – Kamehameha Swim Club
NBC Olympics Profile

1984 births
Living people
Marshallese male swimmers
American male swimmers
Olympic swimmers of the Marshall Islands
Swimmers at the 2008 Summer Olympics
Male backstroke swimmers
Swimmers from Honolulu